Walnut Hill School for the Arts is an independent boarding school and day school for the arts located in Natick, Massachusetts, United States. It is intended for student artists in grade 9-12.

History and programs

Boarding school
Walnut Hill was founded in 1893 by Florence Bigelow and Charlotte Conant as a college preparatory school for women and a feeder school for Wellesley College. Even as a traditional private boarding school for girls, Walnut Hill's arts programs were strong. The school was home to acclaimed Fenway Studios artist and teacher Marion L. Pooke, class of 1901, and Pulitzer Prize–winning author and Poet Laureate Elizabeth Bishop, class of 1930. It became coeducational and arts-focused in the late 1970s in response to changes in the educational landscape.

Majors
Students at Walnut Hill major in one of five arts disciplines: dance, music, theatre, visual art, and writing, film, and media arts. Writing, film and media arts classes include but are not limited to poetry, fiction, screenwriting, cinematography and darkroom photography.

Boston Ballet

Boston Ballet School merged with the Walnut Hill dance program in 2020 rebranding the company as Boston Ballet's pre professional division at Walnut Hill. While this was beneficial for both organizations it was met with backlash by many members of the Walnut Hill community.

Campus

Stowe, Eliot, Highland, Clark, New Cottage, Westerly, North House and Elizabeth Bishop Hall are the school's dorms. The campus also holds the Academic and Technology Center; the Delbridge Family Center for the Arts; the Dance Center; the Keiter Center for the Performing Arts; the Writing, Film, and Media Arts building; the Office of Admission; and the Head's House.

Eliot is the largest building on campus; its second and third floors serve as a dormitory. It contains Boswell Hall, the Keefe center, the dining hall, the student campus center and the school bookstore. Highland contains music practice rooms (both regular and soundproof), the Visual Art studios, Pooke Gallery, Amelia Hall and Highland Dormitory. Stowe, in addition to being a dormitory, is the location of the switchboard and many administrative offices, including the Head of School's office, external relations and facilities.

The Delbridge Family Center for the Arts is the most recent addition to the campus. It began construction in the 2015–2016 school year and was completed in July 2016. This structure includes a dance studio, a black box and a gallery.

Traditions

Mountain Day: This tradition takes place in October and serves as a community-building event for the senior class. The entire class ascends one of the most hiked mountains in the world, Mount Monadnock. This event gives the students a sense of accomplishment and class spirit.

Tree Day: During the last week of the academic semester, the senior class, usually given the option to pick, will choose a tree to plant on campus and where they plant it. This is a way that students can leave remember their legacy at the school.

Notable alumni
Elizabeth Bishop, Poet Laureate of the United States, 1949-1950
Mei-Ann Chen, Assistant Conductor, Atlanta Symphony Orchestra
Ava Deluca-Verley, actress in Growing Up Fisher
Ralph Farris, co-founder, artistic director and violist of the string quartet ETHEL
Gavin Rayna Russom, musician
Christian Finnegan, stand-up comedian and actor
Jimmy Fowlie, actor
Van Hansis, soap opera actor 
Briga Heelan, actress in Ground Floor
Heather Hemmens, played Alice Verdura in Hellcats
Judith Hoag, actress, played April O'Neill in Teenage Mutant Ninja Turtles, and acting teacher
Jovanna Huguet, actress and dancer
Benny Ibarra, singer, musician, producer and actor
Lia Ices, musician
Rachelle Lefèvre, TV and film actress; Twilight film series and Under the Dome television series
George Li, concert pianist
Jack McCollough, co-founder of Proenza Schouler
Charlie Neshyba-Hodges, played Marty in Come Fly Away; dancer and Ballet Master for Benjamin Millipied L.A. Dance Project
Teddy Quinlivan, supermodel
Chris Riggi, actor, played Scott Rosson on Gossip Girl
Sasha Sokol, singer, composer, actress, and TV host
Paige Turco, actress, played April O'Neill in Teenage Mutant Ninja Turtles 2: Secret of the Ooze
Chi Che Wang, research biochemist and college professor
Barrett Wilbert Weed Broadway actress, played Veronica in Heathers: The Musical off-Broadway and Janis in Mean Girls (musical) on Broadway

References

External links
 Official Walnut Hill School website
 The Blue Pencil online
 Walnut Hill Facebook page
 The Association of Boarding Schools profile
https://www.walnuthillarts.org/arts-high-school/daily-life/traditions 

Natick, Massachusetts
Schools in Middlesex County, Massachusetts
Private high schools in Massachusetts
Boarding schools in Massachusetts
Schools of the performing arts in the United States
Ballet schools in the United States